Aspera may refer to:

Music
 Aspera (band), an American indie rock band
 (a)spera, a 2009 album by Mirah
 Above Symmetry, a Norwegian progressive metal band originally known as Aspera
 "Aspera", the lead track from We Will Become Like Birds by Erin McKeown

Science
 Aspera European Astroparticle network, a physics organization

Technology
Aspera (company) a file transfer software company
Analyzer of Space Plasmas and Energetic Atoms, an instrument package on the Mars Express and Venus Express spacecraft
 Automatic Space Plasma Experiment with Rotating Analyzer, an instrument on board the Phobos 2 spacecraft

Biology and Anatomy
 Ulmus 'Aspera', a kind of elm tree
 Aspera, a nomen superfluum for the Rubiaceae genus Galium
 H. aspera (disambiguation), several species of plants
 Linea aspera, a bone structure in human anatomy

Other
 Per aspera ad astra, a Latin phrase